Mostaccioli may refer to:

 A variation of penne pasta
 Mustacciuoli or mostaccioli, a Southern Italian dessert